These are the Canadian number-one albums of 1985. The chart is compiled by Nielsen Soundscan and published by Jam! Canoe, issued every Sunday. The chart also appears in Billboard magazine as Top Canadian Albums.

See also
List of Canadian number-one singles of 1985

References

External links
Top 100 albums in Canada on Jam
Billboard Top Canadian Albums

1985
1985 record charts
1985 in Canadian music